Ground pressure is the pressure exerted on the ground by the tires or tracks of a motorized vehicle, and is one measure of its potential mobility, especially over soft ground.  It also applies to the feet of a walking person or machine. Pressure is measured in the SI unit of pascals (Pa).  Average ground pressure can be calculated using the standard formula for average pressure: P = F/A.  In an idealised case, i.e. a static, uniform net force normal to level ground, this is simply the object's weight divided by contact area. The ground pressure of motorized vehicles is often compared with the ground pressure of a human foot, which can be 60 – 80 kPa while walking or as much as 13 MPa for a person in spike heels.

Increasing the size of the contact area on the ground (the footprint) in relation to the weight decreases the unit ground pressure. Ground pressure of 14 kPa (2 psi) or less is recommended for fragile ecosystems like marshes.  Decreasing the ground pressure increases the flotation, allowing easier passage of the body over soft terrain. This is exemplified by use of equipment such as snowshoes.

Examples

All examples are approximate, and will vary based on conditions

Note:
The pressures for adult human male and horse are for standing still position. A walking human will exert more than double his standing pressure. A galloping horse will exert up to 3.5 MPa (500 psi). The ground pressure for a pneumatic tire is roughly equal to its inflation pressure.

See also
Contact patch
Tire load sensitivity

Related reading
 Theory of Ground Vehicles

References

Automotive engineering
Physical quantities